Scalicus engyceros is a species of marine ray-finned fish belonging to the family Peristediidae, the armoured gurnards or armored sea robins. This species is found in northwestern Pacific Ocean.

Taxonomy
Scalicus engyceros was first formally described as Peristethus engyceros in 1872 by the German-born British herpetologist and ichthyologist Albert Günther with the type locality given as the Hawaiian Islands. Some authorities regard S. gilberti and S, investigatoris as a junior synonyms of S. engyceros. The specific name engyceros combines engys, meaning “near” , with ceros, which means “horn”, an allusion Günther did not explain but may refer to the horn like projections on the rostrum.

Description

Distribution and habitat
Scalicus engyceros is found in the western Pacific Ocean off southern Japan, the South China Sea and in the central western Pacific in Hawaii. It is a benthic species of rocky and sandy substrates at depths between

References 

engyceros
Fish described in 1872
Taxa named by Albert Günther